Eldership of Spisz was a non-castle eldership territory of Kingdom of Poland from 1412 to 1569 and Lesser Poland Province, Crown of the Kingdom of Poland, Polish–Lithuanian Commonwealth from 1569 to 1772. Its seat was located in the Stará Ľubovňa. It was located in the Spiš, and its area consisted of a salient connected to the rest of the Kingdom of Poland, and 5 exclaves.

It was formed on 8 November 1412, after the signing of Spiš Pledge between Władysław II Jagiełło, king of Poland and Sigismund, king of Hungary, in which the Kingdom of Hungary had pledges part of Szepes County to the Kingdom of Poland in exchange for 2 220 000 Prague groschen. The area was meant to remain in Poland until Hungary would pay the loan back, however, it was permanently incorporated as Polish possession in 1489 after Hungary had made a failed attempt to regain the area with military force. In 1569, after the formation of Polish–Lithuanian Commonwealth, it became a part of Lesser Poland Province, Crown of the Kingdom of Poland. The eldership got conquered by Habsburg monarchy between 1769 and 1770 and remained under occupation until 1772 when it was formally incorporated into the Szepes County, Kingdom of Hungary.

Subdivisions and borders
It was subdivided into the Dominion of Lubowla and Province of 13 Spisz Towns. Dominion of Lubowla consisted of the towns of Stará Ľubovňa, Podolínec and Hniezdne, and the souranding area. Its capital was Stará Ľubovňa. The dominion bordered the Kingdom of Poland to the north and Podoliniec District, Province of 13 Spisz Towns to the south. The Province of 13 Spisz Towns consisted of the towns of Spišská Nová Ves, Spišské Vlachy, Spišské Podhradie, Poprad, Veľká, Spišská Sobota, Stráže pod Tatrami, Matejovce, Spišská Belá, Vrbov, Ľubica, Ruskinovce, and Tvarožná, and 15 villages. It consisted of 6 separate parts, of which Podoliniec District bordered the Dominion of Lubowla, while 5 others were the exclaves surrounded by the Kingdom of Hungary. Additionally, Spiš Castle in Spišské Podhradie was an exclave of Hungary surrounded by the Eldership.

Citations

Notes

References

Bibliography
 Encyklopédia Slovenska, Bratislava, 1980.
 Julia Radziszewska, Studia spiskie. Katowice. 1985.
 Terra Scepusiensis. Stan badań nad dziejami Spiszu. Lewocza-Wrocław. 2003.

Eldership of Spisz
Subdivisions of the Polish–Lithuanian Commonwealth
Fiefdoms of Poland
Eldership of Spisz
Eldership of Spisz
18th-century disestablishments in Poland
States and territories established in 1412
States and territories disestablished in 1772
Former exclaves